Fudbalski klub Željezničar Sarajevo (English: Football Club Željezničar Sarajevo), commonly referred to as Željo, is a professional football club, based in Sarajevo, Bosnia and Herzegovina. The name Željezničar means "railway worker", originating from their establishment by a group of railway workers in 1921. Throughout its history, the club has cultivated a reputation for producing talented home-grown players through its academy.

During the days of socialist Yugoslavia, FK Željezničar were national champions in the 1971–72 season, qualifying for the European Cup during the 1972–73 season. The club has also finished as runners-up once in the league, and contested 1980–81 Yugoslav Cup final. In Europe, the club reached UEFA Cup semi-finals during the 1984–85 season and the quarter-finals during the 1971–72 season.

Željezničar is the most successful football team in present-day Bosnia, having won 6 Bosnian championships, 6 Bosnian Cups and 3 Bosnian Supercups. The club's so far best post-war European result was qualifying to the 2002–03 Champions League third qualifying round, losing to Newcastle United. Their biggest rival is FK Sarajevo with whom they contest the biggest football match in Bosnia and Herzegovina, the Sarajevo derby.

History

Pre-independence (1921–1992)
Željezničar was formed by a group of railway workers. During the early 20th century, there were several football clubs in Sarajevo. They were rich and usually backed by various organizations, most of them on an ethnic basis: Bosniaks, Serbs, Bosnian Croats, Bosnian Jews, unlike Željezničar. Since it was a financially poor club, they used to organize dance nights and all the profits made were later used to buy shoes and balls.

Financial problems were not the only ones. The club's embrace of members of all ethnic backgrounds was seen as a threat by many at the time, so Željezničar was suppressed in various ways. Despite that, the club managed to survive, and even beat wealthier clubs. The first official match, a friendly, was played at Kovačići, a Sarajevo settlement, on 17 September 1921 against SAŠK Napredak which resulted in 1–5 defeat. The next day another game was played, a 1–2 loss vs Sarajevski ŠK.

In 1941, World War II came to Sarajevo, and all football activity was stopped. Many footballers were members of the resistance troops, and some of them were killed. After the war, Željo was reborn, and in 1946, it won the Bosnian Republic championship which was one of the 7 regional leagues formed in order to provide participants to the restored Yugoslav championship starting next season. As winners, Željezničar became one of the Bosnian representatives in the Yugoslav top-flight. Soon after, the Sarajevo citizens formed a new club called FK Sarajevo, the club that has remained a major annoyance to Željezničar's fans (known as The Maniacs) until today. That had an influence on the club, so it needed several years to come back to the first division. For most of the time, Željezničar played in the top level. It was relegated four times (the last time in the 1976–77 season), but every time (except the first time in 1947) it returned quickly.

Planinić affair

In 1964, the Football Association of Yugoslavia found Željezničar guilty for match fixing. Alongside Željezničar, Hajduk Split and Trešnjevka were found guilty and were ejected from the First Yugoslav League. Among others, Željezničar players Ivica Osim and Mišo Smajlović were banned from football for one year, and executives from Željezničar including then club president Nusret Mahić were banned from football for life. After a month it was decided that the clubs will stay in the league but points will be deducted, six from Željezničar and five from Hajduk and Trešnjevka each.

UEFA Cup 1971–72 quarter-finalists
The club first appeared in European competitions during the 1963 Mitropa Cup, however serious competitions had to wait until the early 1970s when the team finished the 1970–71 Yugoslav First League season in 2nd place, a result which allowed the club to play in the 1971–72 UEFA Cup where they made the quarter-finals on their very first appearance losing to Ferencvárosi in a penalty shootout.

1971–72 Yugoslav champions
1971–72 Yugoslav First League table (top 5 only):

Željezničar's greatest domestic success at the time came in the 1971–72 season when the team won the championship title, their only top-tier title in the Yugoslav period, which qualified the club for the European Cup during the 1972–73 season where they were eliminated in the first round by Derby County.

Željezničar also finished in third place in the top-tier league on two occasions in a league traditionally dominated by the big four clubs (Red Star Belgrade, Partizan, Hajduk Split and Dinamo Zagreb).

1980–81 Marshal Tito Cup finalists
In the 1980–81 season, Željezničar reached the Yugoslav cup final (Marshal Tito Cup), but lost 2–3 to another Bosnian side Velež Mostar with both Mehmed Baždarević and Vahid Halilhodžić scoring a brace for their respective teams. The venue for the final was the Red Star Stadium in Belgrade played in front of 40,000 fans. That season, Željezničar finished the 1980–81 Yugoslav First League in a disappointing 14th position which meant the club did not play in Europe even though it made the Yugoslav Cup final.

UEFA Cup 1984–85 semi-finalists
Željezničar's best international result was recorded in the 1984–85 season. The team, led by manager Ivica Osim, reached the semi-finals of the UEFA Cup (renamed to UEFA Europa League since the 2009–10 season) where they were eliminated by Hungarian team Videoton. Željezničar finished the domestic championship in third place in the season before, qualifying them for the competition. Željezničar appeared to have had the result at home, leading 2–0 (3–3 on aggregate) against the Hungarians that would send them into a final against Spanish club Real Madrid on the away goals rule; however, two minutes from full-time Videoton scored a crucial goal, eliminating the home side 4–3 on aggregate. Edin Bahtić finished the competition as second-top scorer with 7 goals, one short of József Szabó.

Prior to this success, the team played the quarter-final stage of the inaugural year of the UEFA Cup competition.

Post-independence (1992–present)

After the independence of Bosnia and Herzegovina, war broke out and football stopped. The game between Željezničar and FK Rad scheduled to be played on 5 April 1992 at Stadion Grbavica as part of Round 26 of the 1991–92 Yugoslav First League was abandoned 35 minutes (14:55 p.m. local time) before kick-off due to gunfire around the stadium, a result of the first attack on Sarajevo. Ultimately, the club's final completed match in the Yugoslav Championship was a 6–1 defeat on 29 March 1992 in Belgrade against Partizan. Players like Mario Stanić, Rade Bogdanović, Gordan Vidović, Suvad Katana and many others had days earlier went abroad to escape the horror of war, leaving it up to junior players to play out remaining rounds of the championships. However, all of Željezničar's matches in the 2nd half of the 1991–92 season were declared void due to rule, as the club could not play out remaining matches due to the ensuing war. In 25 (out of possible 33) rounds completed, the club collected 6 wins, 4 draws and 15 losses, with a 22:42 goal difference.

The stadium was right on the front lines, and on 7 May 1992, the western side was destroyed along with SD Željezničar premises near by, however Željezničar managed to take part in the 1994–95 First League of Bosnia and Herzegovina championship, playing its home matches in Grbavica. The fourth-place result was not as important as simply taking part.

The war ended in 1995 so a regular championship was formed contested only by Bosniak and Croatian clubs with Serb clubs joining some years later.

During the 1997–98 championship, a play-off was held and the final match on 5 June saw two big city rivals playing for the trophy. FK Sarajevo played well, their shots were cleared from the goal-line twice. In the 89th minute, one ball was intercepted on the left side, and after a couple of passes it came to Željezničar forward Hadis Zubanović who scored a dramatic winner. That was the only goal of the game which brought his club its first championship title in independent Bosnia and Herzegovina. Among Željezničar club fans, this day, titled "Zubandan", is celebrated every year.

2000s: Two-time league champions

For a long time, Željezničar were the only club that were able to defend their title in the Bosnian Premier League, as champions in the 2000–01 and 2001–02 season under the command of Ivica Osim's son, Amar Osim. The club repeated this success again in the early 2010s. Under Amar's command, Željezničar also won the 2000–01 national cup, which completed the double, the first time any club in Bosnia and Herzegovina achieved that, securing also the 2001 Bosnian Supercup. In the 2001–02 season, they were runners-up in the cup, but were not able to defend their Bosnian Supercup title (even though they won the league) as it was discontinued. Amar was dismissed from the club in October 2003 after the club was runner-up in the 2002–03 season, won the 2002–03 national cup and reached the club's biggest European success since competing as part of the Bosnian Premier League, that is the 2002–03 Champions league third qualifying round which they lost against Newcastle United. They continued their journey in the UEFA Cup, losing to Málaga due to a penalty they scored in the second leg. Željezničar finished as runners-up both seasons after Amar Osim's departure. After they secured qualification for the 2005–06 UEFA Cup through their league position, they failed to get a licence for European competition, missing out on substantial financial gain from UEFA. This led to many problems for the club, and over the next four seasons Željezničar struggled in the middle of the league.

As the best Bosnian club, the club played in European cups every year. The best result (for Bosnian club football as well since independence) came in 2002, when Željezničar reached the third qualifying round of the UEFA Champions League, having eliminated Akraness and Lillestrøm in previous rounds to get there. Sir Bobby Robson's Newcastle United, captained by Alan Shearer, were too strong, winning 5–0 on aggregate when Sanel Jahić received a red card in the 69th minute of the reverse leg at St James' Park. The game was held at Koševo Stadium in front of 36,000 fans from all over Bosnia and Herzegovina, and to this day is among the best attended games in Bosnian club football history, although short of a match at the same stadium between the Bosnia and Herzegovina national football team's 2–1 friendly win over Italy in November 1996, which was attended by 40,000. Newcastle United reached the second group stage of the tournament later on in the season.

The club, as result of losing to Newcastle United, entered the UEFA Cup first round, but lost to Málaga who were an eventual quarter-finalist.

2010s: Three-time league champions

With the return of Amar Osim in the summer of 2009, Željezničar once more claimed the title in the 2009–10 season, but failed to take the double as they lost in the final of the 2009–10 Bosnian cup to Borac Banja Luka on away goals, while remaining undefeated. In the following 2010–11 season, the club failed to defend their Premier League title, finishing third. However, Željezničar managed to win the national cup instead, their fourth, against Čelik Zenica. During the 2011–12 season, they brought back the league title to Grbavica, their sixth domestic league title, three rounds before the end of the season, breaking many records on the way (run of 35 games without loss; 12 straight league wins; 3 seasons in Bosnian Cup competition without loss). Željezničar also won the 2011–12 Bosnian cup, claiming their second double in their history, both won under the managing of Amar Osim. As a result, Amar Osim became the most successful manager in terms of trophies won since the creation of the club, with nine. The club was for a long time undefeated in the Bosnian Cup matches since the first round of the 2008–09 Bosnian Cup season, having won two Cup finals and losing one on aggregate since the 2008–09 season.

During the 2010–11 season, Željezničar won their fourth cup of Bosnia and Herzegovina. They advanced to the final beating Široki Brijeg on 3–0 aggregate. In the final they clash with rivals from the former Yugoslav League, Čelik Zenica. The first game was played at Grbavica Stadium which finished 1–0 in favor of the home team. The second game was played at Bilino Polje Stadium which Željezničar won 3–0 and won 4–0 on aggregate. That concluded Željezničar's season in which they were automatically gave to compete in the UEFA Europa League. Željezničar were able to celebrate their 90th birthday with a trophy.

In the season 2011–12, Željezničar won their 6th title in the team's existence. They won the title with three rounds left in the competition. They repeated the successful campaign in cup competition also when they won the title with 1–0 on aggregate against Široki Brijeg. That was the first double for any club since unified Bosnia and Herzegovina football competitions started in 2002–03 season. In the 2012–13 season, Željezničar won their 7th title in the club's history, 6th Bosnian one, once again under the guidance of Amar Osim.

Between 2013 and 2018, Željezničar had a trophy drought as it did not win any trophies in that period, even though they could have on multiple occasions as they finished 2nd on three occasions, every time just missing out on the title.

The club has had a poor final series results (post regular season); finishing second during competitions for seasons 2016–17 (by single point; being first until the final two rounds) and 2017–18 surrendering titles to rivals HŠK Zrinjski Mostar, who were coached by Blaž Slišković, both times. Further disappointments came when club failed to acquire license to compete in 2019–20 European competitions.

The trophy drought ended in May 2018, as the club won the 2017–18 Bosnian Cup under the guidance of then manager Admir Adžem.

In the period from October to December 2018, the club lost 5 league matches in a row, the worst in the club's history. That made manager Milomir Odović (in 2003–04 and 2015 made great results with Željezničar) resign after the 4th consecutive loss. Their 5th consecutive loss came on 2 December, against Široki Brijeg in the last game of the first part of the season. In that game, Adin Mulaosmanović and Ismet Štilić were caretaker managers. On 31 December 2018, Amar Osim  for a second time in his career came back to Željezničar and signed a three-and-a-half-year contract with the club. In Osim's first game after returning to the club, Željezničar lost against Radnik Bijeljina, making that 6 losses in a row, but in his second game against Mladost Doboj Kakanj, Željezničar beat Mladost and ended their 6-game loss run.

2020s: 100 years of the club

The 2019–20 Bosnian Premier League season ended abruptly on 1 June 2020 due to the ongoing COVID-19 pandemic in Bosnia and Herzegovina, with Željezničar having to settle with a second spot on table. City rivals Sarajevo won the title even though Željezničar won six points from two derby matches played during the league season. In the 2019–20 Bosnian Cup, they finished at the semi-final stage as the competition was cancelled due to the pandemic.

The 2020–21 season started strongly winning four opening matches, however their run in the 2020–21 UEFA Europa League was affected due to the pandemic. The first qualifying round match between Maccabi Haifa, originally scheduled to be played on 27 August 2020 was postponed due to five members from Željezničar's delegation testing positive for COVID-19 and the whole team being put into quarantine by the Israeli authorities. Originally six players earlier tested positive and did not travel, being left in Sarajevo. The team returned to Sarajevo before UEFA made a decision to finally play the match on 9 September at Sammy Ofer Stadium in Haifa. Željezničar traveled again but lost 1–3 (thus eliminated after revised rules due to the pandemic) after being in quarantine 9 days prior with little to no training and no competitive matches since shock loss at home to Mladost Doboj Kakanj in the 5th round on 21 August of the 2020–21 Bosnian Premier League season. In the middle of an eight game winless run in the 2020–21 league season, which had culminated with a home draw against Mladost Doboj Kakanj, Amar Osim was sacked by the club on 11 April 2021. After Osim got sacked on 11 April, three days later, on 14 April, Blaž Slišković was named as Željezničar's new manager.

On 18 June 2021, after Slišković left the club, Croatian manager Tomislav Ivković became the new manager of Željezničar. In January 2022, after he left the club, Ivković was replaced by Edis Mulalić.

Stadium

The club had no stadium upon its foundation as other clubs would not allow Željezničar to use the existing football grounds in Sarajevo. The club played their first matches at a military training pitch called Egzercir which wasn't actually a football ground, however, it was the best ground available and will always be remembered as the club's first pitch. Egzercir was located in a part of Sarajevo known as Čengić vila. In 1932, a new ground was built in Pofalići (yet another part of Sarajevo), close to the railway station. It wasn't much better than the last one, but it was built by the club and because of that it had a special meaning.

After World War II, Željezničar played at the "6th April" Stadium in Marijin Dvor (there is a building now on the spot, behind the technical sciences secondary school) until 18 June 1950. Authorities planned to build a street, so the club made another move to military stadium in Skenderija. Club staff was tired of all that moving and they decided to build its own stadium in Grbavica neighborhood which just started to be redeveloped and urbanized. Friends, supporters, members of the club and even military, all helped in construction. Stadium was officially opened on 13 September 1951 with the second league match between Željezničar and Šibenik. Željezničar won 4–1.

Ever since, Grbavica has been a place of joy and sorrow for the club and its supporters. Symbolically, the old railway line passed over the hill behind the stadium, and every time a train went by during a match it would sound its whistle to salute the fans. The stadium had a south side and a small east side while a wooden grandstand with a roof was on the west side. The grandstand was relocated from the "6th April" Stadium on the same year when Željezničar moved. Because of the reconstruction, Željezničar moved again in 1968 to Koševo Stadium and even won the club's only Yugoslav title in 1972 playing there.

Grbavica was reopened yet again on 25 April 1976, and in 1986 a modern northern stand was added which is still in use. Unfortunately, war began in spring 1992 and Željezničar was forced, yet again, to play on Koševo Stadium until 1996 when it came back to Grbavica. During the 1990s war, the stadium suffered heavy structural damage. The stadium was located between the first front lines and endured heavy fighting. Bosnian Serbs' forces burned down the wooden grandstand under which all the club facilities were located consequently burning down most of the club's records and trophies in the process as well. It was not until 2 May 1996 that a football match would be played on Grbavica Stadium again. Symbolically, the first match after the war was the Sarajevo derby. The wooden grandstand that burned up during the war was never fully reconstructed and on its place, on the west side of the stadium, a much smaller wooden stand was built under which, yet again, all the club facilities are located. In 2016, the wooden stand was reconstructed and slightly expanded in a way that all the wood elements were replaced with anti-slip metal in order to meet the UEFA Stadium requirements.

Before the war capacity of the stadium was more than 20,000 unseated, but now it officially has 13,146 seated places with room for around 4,000 more patrons in standing areas.

Name of the club
Željezničar was formed as RŠD Željezničar (Radničko športsko društvo, eng. Workers' sports society). Željezničar means railwayman or railway worker. Later it was known as FK Željezničar (Fudbalski klub, eng. football club), and was a part of SD Željezničar (Sportsko društvo, eng. sports society) which includes the clubs in other sports (basketball, handball, volleyball, chess, bowling, etc.) with the same name. In 1993, initial acronym was changed to NK (Nogometni klub, eng. football club). In Bosnian, both fudbal and nogomet are equally used as a word for football. The word fudbal is dominant in eastern and nogomet in western parts of the country. Since 2000, club's name is officially with initial FK again.

In the modern times, there is even a restaurant named after the club's name. Such example is a ćevapithe national dishrestaurant at the heart of Sarajevo called Ćevabdžinica "Željo".

Colours
Blue is traditionally colour of railway workers in this part of Europe. Since the club was founded by the railway workers, blue was a logical choice. Standard navy blue colour was always on the club's crest, but it is a different story with kits. Sometimes they were light blue, sometimes regular blue, and sometimes navy blue as it is on the crest. Sometimes kits were blue and white vertical striped. For some games in 1999–00 season, kits were striped horizontally, and in 2002–03 season they were even dark grey, without any traces of blue. Away kit was always white.

On the left side of the kit, by the heart, stands a crest. Since the foundation of the club, standard elements of the crest were ball and wings, also a traditional railway symbol. These standard elements were changed in design several times in the past. Some other elements were added or excluded in some periods of history. For example, circle around the original crest was added in the 1990s. From 1945. to 1992. red five-pointed star stood in place of the ball, and words "Sarajevo", "1921" and others were moved form one part of the crest to another many times. Current design dates back to 2000.

Supporters

FK Željezničar main supporter group are called The Maniacs. There is also subgroups like Blue Tigers, Joint Union, Urban Corps, Stari Grad and Vendetta.

In popular culture, Stole Anđelović (Stole iz Bora) – a passionate club supporter from Bor, Serbia, is known decades (over 40 years) for traveling 450 km to attend most FK Željezničar Sarajevo home games, and was a long time supporter of Yugoslav national team as well as fan of Ivica Osim.

A passionate group of fans from 1921.ba TV upload regular Željezničar league and European match reports as well as interviews with players and staff to online stream media; YouTube.

Rivalries

Sarajevo derby (Vječiti derbi)

Željezničar has a fierce rivalry with their city-rivals Sarajevo, which is known as the Sarajevo derby, the biggest derby in Bosnia and Herzegovina. It is contested regularly since both teams are part of the Premier League of Bosnia and Herzegovina.

Many Željezničar supporters say that "Željo is a matter of philosophy, and Sarajevo a matter of geography". Famous Sarajevo derby, known across the Southeast Europe, is generally considered one of few with the best atmosphere. But there is one thing that separates it from similar ones in the region and rest of the world – fans of these clubs are enemies only for the time needed for game to be played. It is not rare that father and son, two brothers, or husband and wife, are on the opposite sides. They don't speak to each other that day. But when the game ends, provocations are something of a tradition, strangest bets are needed to be fulfilled. And everybody is waiting for the next one. Although, incidents between younger fans can be seen in recent years.

During the 2015–16 season the club beat FK Sarajevo both home and away, a first time the club has beaten Sarajevo away at the Asim Ferhatović Hase Stadium in 12 years.

During the 2017–18 league season, Željezničar beat Sarajevo in 3 out of 4 league matches, the most in one season and didn't even lose that season as there was also 1 draw.

During the 2018–19 league season, Željezničar lost against Sarajevo in 2 out of 3 league matches, the most in one season and didn't even win that season as there was also 1 draw. The last match was played on 8 March 2023 where Željezničar drew 0–0.

Željezničar – Borac Banja Luka rivalry
Also another notable rivalry started to shape in recent years. Since the season 2008–09, the time when Borac started to be standard in the Premier League once again, a great rivalry started to develop between the two teams. Starting from the 2009–10 season the two teams mainly competed against each other for one of the titles (the league title or national cup) and even the attendance almost got on pair with the Sarajevo derby. The rivalry also has a root in the fact that Sarajevo and Banja Luka are, by a good margin, the two biggest cities in Bosnia and Herzegovina, the first being also the capital of the whole country while the second takes the role as the de facto capital of Republika Srpska entity. Since independence of Bosnia and Herzegovina the teams met each other 22 times (6 of which are in national cup), although they played the first time against each other in 1947 Yugoslav Cup. In those 22 matches, Željezničar won 12 times, while Borac managed to win 7 times, with 3 matches ending in a draw. The goal difference is 31:19 in favor of Željezničar (Not including results from 2015 to 2016 season).

Kit manufacturers

Club seasons

FK Željezničar Sarajevo is the most decorated club from Bosnia and Herzegovina having won six Bosnian Cups, six Bosnian Premier League titles, three Bosnian Supercups and one Yugoslav First League title.

Honours

Domestic

League
Premier League of Bosnia and Herzegovina:
Winners (6): 1997–98, 2000–01, 2001–02, 2009–10, 2011–12, 2012–13
Runners-up (7): 2002–03, 2003–04, 2004–05, 2014–15, 2016–17, 2017–18, 2019–20
Yugoslav First League:
Winners (1): 1971–72
Runners-up (1): 1970–71
Yugoslav Second League:
Winners (3): 1956–57 , 1961–62 , 1977–78 
Runners-up (1): 1953–54
Bosnia and Herzegovina Republic League:
Winners (1): 1946

Cups
Bosnia and Herzegovina Cup:
Winners (6): 1999–2000, 2000–01, 2002–03, 2010–11, 2011–12, 2017–18
Runners-up (4): 1996–97, 2001–02, 2009–10, 2012–13
Yugoslav Cup:
Runners-up (1): 1980–81
Supercup of Bosnia and Herzegovina:
Winners (3): 1998, 2000, 2001  (record)

European
UEFA Cup/UEFA Europa League:
Semi-finalists (1): 1984–85
Quarter-finalists (1): 1971–72

Doubles
Premier League and National Cup (2): 2000–01, 2011–12  (record)

Željezničar in Europe

FK Željezničar Sarajevo has played more games in European competitions than any other football team from Bosnia and Herzegovina.

P = Matches played; W = Matches won; D = Matches drawn; L = Matches lost; GF = Goals for; GA = Goals against; GD = Goals difference. Defunct competitions indicated in italics.

Best results in European competitions

Records
Biggest ever league victory: Željezničar – Barkohba 18–2 (23 March 1925, Second Sarajevo division)
Biggest ever league defeat: 1–9 on several occasions
Biggest Yugoslav first division victory: Željezničar – Maribor 8–0 (29 August 1971)
Biggest Yugoslav first division defeat: Dinamo Zagreb – Željezničar 9–1 (29 September 1946)
Biggest Sarajevo derby victory by Željezničar: Željezničar – Torpedo 9–1 (29 December 1946)
Biggest Bosnian league victory: Željezničar – Krajina Cazin 8–0 (31 March 2001), Željezničar – Leotar 8–0 (28 August 2010)
Biggest Bosnian league defeat: Zmaj od Bosne – Željezničar 9–1 (4 November 1995)
Most overall official appearances: Blagoje Bratić (343)
Most league appearances: Hajrudin Saračević (313)
Most league games without loss (Bosnia and Herzegovina): 35 games (2011–12 season)
Most straight wins (Bosnia and Herzegovina): 12 league games
Most overall official goals: Josip Bukal, Dželaludin Muharemović (127)
Most league goals: Dželaludin Muharemović (112)
Most league goals in a season by team: 113 (2000–01 season)
Most league goals in a season by player: 31 (Dželaludin Muharemović in 2000–01 season)
Most capped player: Mehmed Baždarević (54 caps for Yugoslavia, 2 caps for Bosnia and Herzegovina)

Record departures

Players

Current squad

Players with multiple nationalities
  Aleksandar Kosorić
  Josip Bender

Out on loan

Club officials

Coaching staff
{|
|valign="top"|

Other information

Notable managers

Club ranking
According to the IFFHS list of the Top 200 European clubs of the 20th century, an organization recognized by FIFA, Željezničar is the highest ranked Bosnian club, sharing the 110th position on the list with AZ Alkmaar and Vitória de Guimarães. The club has produced many famous Yugoslav and Bosnian players, including Ivica Osim, Josip Katalinski, Mišo Smajlović, Blagoje Bratić, Hajrudin Saračević, Josip Bukal, Božo Janković, Mehmed Baždarević, Edin Bahtić, Radmilo Mihajlović, Haris Škoro, Nikola Nikić, Edin Ćurić, Dželaludin Muharemović, Edin Višća, Riad Bajić and Edin Džeko.

UEFA coefficient

2020–21 season

Affiliated clubs
The following clubs are currently affiliated with FK Željezničar:
 Medeama (2021–present)
 Igman Konjic (2021–present)

References

External links

 
Official fan shop website  
Official supporters' website 

 
Football clubs from Sarajevo
Football clubs in Bosnia and Herzegovina
Football clubs in Yugoslavia
Association football clubs established in 1921
1921 establishments in Bosnia and Herzegovina
Sport in Sarajevo
Sarajevo